Kilafors is a locality situated in Bollnäs Municipality, Gävleborg County, Sweden with 1,126 inhabitants in 2010.

Overview
The small town is located off of the 83 road from Gävle that runs through to Bollnäs and then further north. The town has a bank, two supermarkets, and two pay-by-card fuel stations. One hamburger restaurant, one Pizza and ala carte restaurant and one restaurant with a Swedish traditional menu. There is also an auto dealer, a couple of car repair shops and a cafe in the old railway station where there also is a clothing store. Also available is a hardware, paint, flower and TV and electronics store.

The town is a great place for outdoor recreation activities and have good communications to larger towns and cities nearby.

References 

Populated places in Bollnäs Municipality
Hälsingland